Hylocomium is a genus of mosses belonging to the family Hylocomiaceae.

The genus was first described by Wilhelm Philippe Schimper in 1852.

Species:
 Hylocomium interruptum Margadant, 1972
 Hylocomium splendens W.P. Schimper, 1852
 Hylocomiastrum umbratum (Ehrh. ex Hedw.) M. Fleisch.

References

Hypnales
Moss genera